Thomas Mark Lamarre (born 1959) is an American-Canadian academic, author, Japanologist and professor at the University of Chicago in the  Department of Cinema and Media Studies.

Education
LaMarre was awarded a bachelor's degree in Biology in 1981 at Georgetown University.  He continued his studies in science and the  Université de la Méditerranée Aix-Marseille II in France, earning a Master's equivalent degree in Oceanology in 1982, and a doctorate equivalent in Oceanology in 1985.

LaMarre then entered a second doctorate program at the University of Chicago, where he earned a master's degree in East Asian Languages and Civilizations in 1987.  Chicago granted his second doctorate in 1992.

Career
In addition to teaching, LaMarre is the Major Undergraduate Program Director in the Department of East Asian Studies at McGill.  His on-going areas of research encompass "an emphasis on new modes of spectatorship (fan cultures), production (cooperatives and multi-authorship), aesthetics (multiplanar images), narrative (myth and epic) and distribution (globalization)."

Selected works
In a statistical overview derived from writings by and about Thomas LaMarre, OCLC/WorldCat encompasses roughly six works in ten publications in one language and 600+ library holding.

 Can Writing Go on Without a Mind? Orality, Literacy, Ideography, Japanology (1994)
 Uncovering Heian Japan: an Archaeology of Sensation and Inscription (2000)
 Project Insider (2000)
 Impacts of Modernities (2004)
 Shadows on the Screen: Tanizaki Jun'ichirō on Cinema and "Oriental" Aesthetics (2005)
 The Anime Machine: A Media Theory of Animation (2009)
 The Anime Ecology: A Genealogy of Television, Animation, and Game Media (2018)

Honors
 Association for Asian Studies, John Whitney Hall Book Prize, 1999.

References 

Anime and manga critics
Historians of Japan
Canadian Japanologists
Living people
1959 births
University of the Mediterranean alumni
Academic staff of McGill University